Navajo Lake Airport  is a public use airport owned by the New Mexico State Highway and Transportation Department and located in San Juan County, New Mexico, United States. The airport is situated west of Navajo Lake. According to the FAA's National Plan of Integrated Airport Systems for 2009–2013, it is categorized as a general aviation facility.

Facilities and aircraft 
It has one runway designated 6/24 with an asphalt surface measuring 4,995 by 60 feet (1,522 x 18 m). For the 12-month period ending April 15, 2010, the airport had 200 general aviation aircraft operations, an average of 16 per month.

References

External links 
 Aerial image as of 13 October 1997 from USGS The National Map
 

Airports in New Mexico
Buildings and structures in San Juan County, New Mexico
Transportation in San Juan County, New Mexico